Congosto is a village and municipality located in the region of El Bierzo (province of León, Castile and León, Spain) . It is located near to Ponferrada, the capital of the region. The village of Congosto has about 350 inhabitants.

Its economy was traditionally based on agriculture, wine and coal mining. Nowadays, most of the inhabitants work on the surrounding area on activities such as wind turbine manufacturing or coal mining.

Congosto also a large reservoir in its vicinity, the Barcena reservoir, to which many tourists visit during the summer.

Born in Congosto
Álvaro de Mendaña de Neira (1541-1595), navigator

See also
 El Bierzo
 Álvaro de Mendaña de Neira

References

Municipalities in El Bierzo